Saint-Jean-de-Dieu is a municipality in Quebec, Canada. The municipality had a population of 1,606 in the Canada 2011 Census.

The two main settlements within the municipality are the communities of Saint-Jean-de-Dieu and La Société. The settlement of Saint-Jean-de-Dieu was counted by Statistics Canada as a designated place in the 2011 census, separately from the boundaries of the municipality as a whole, and had a population of 935.

Demographics

Population

Language

See also
 List of municipalities in Quebec

References

External links
 

Designated places in Quebec
Municipalities in Quebec
Incorporated places in Bas-Saint-Laurent